Ralph Dieter Brock (born February 12, 1951) is a former Canadian Football League (CFL) and National Football League (NFL) player and coach. He is best remembered as the quarterback for the CFL  Winnipeg Blue Bombers where he led the league in passing for four years.

Early life
Brock was born in Birmingham, Alabama. He attended Auburn University and Jacksonville State University, and graduated from Jacksonville State University in 1974.

Professional career
After college graduation, Brock signed a one-year contract with the Winnipeg Blue Bombers and was a starting quarterback in 1975. Nicknamed "The Birmingham Rifle," Brock is only one of two Blue Bombers players to win back-to-back CFL Most Outstanding Player awards in the 1980 and 1981 CFL seasons. In 1981, Brock broke Sam Etcheverry's 1956 record of 4,723 passing yards with 4,796 yards. Brock started his illustrious pro football career as a little used back-up quarterback for the Bombers in 1974. That season the team traded away their aging star passer Don Jonas to the Hamilton Tiger-Cats for the much younger Chuck Ealey. About midway through the 1975 season Brock became the starter and that resulted in Ealey being sent to the Toronto Argonauts.

In 1983, Brock was traded to the Hamilton Tiger-Cats for quarterback Tom Clements. This trade led to an exciting Grey Cup in 1984, as the Tiger-Cats and Blue Bombers faced each other in the championship game. Brock's Tiger-Cat team lost the game to Clements's Blue Bombers 47-17 and Brock ended his career with many accomplishments, but without a Grey Cup victory.

Brock left the CFL after ten seasons and joined the National Football League for the 1985 season. In what would be his only season playing in the NFL, Brock signed with the Los Angeles Rams as a 34-year-old rookie, setting the NFL record for oldest rookie quarterback in history.  Despite the team's star running back Eric Dickerson holding out the first two games over a contract dispute, Brock led the team to a 7-0 start, a feat no other quarterback would accomplish in their first season with a team again until Ben Roethlisberger started 13-0 with the Steelers in 2004. Brock led the team to a division title, the #2 seed in the NFC playoffs, and set team rookie records for passing yards (2,658), touchdown passes (16), and passer rating (81.8) (most of his rookie passing records have since been broken). Brock's final game was the 1985 NFC Championship Game against the Chicago Bears, where he only managed 66 yards passing and lost a fumble that Wilber Marshall returned for a touchdown to close out the scoring in a 24-0 game.

In the 1986 preseason, Brock suffered an injury to his left knee on a tackle by Bo Eason of the Houston Oilers in the first exhibition game on August 2.  Brock underwent  arthroscopic knee surgery the following week and went on the injured reserve list the next month. Although the Rams had Steve Bartkowski as backup, they elected to deal with the Oilers and their new draft pick Jim Everett (who they had a dispute with over signing).
 
When Brock did tests with the team later in the month to test his knee, he aggravated his back (which he stated had been a chronic problem since 1982). Tests revealed he had a "degenerative disk in his lower back", one that could not be corrected by surgery due to the nature of his throwing position, in which he would wrench his back each time he moved to let go of a pass (cortisone injections proved futile).  One of five quarterbacks on the roster, he was released by the team after the a year ended; he chose to move on from playing football to a coaching career.

Brock still holds the Blue Bombers record for career passing yards with 29,623. In 2005, for the commemoration of the Blue Bombers 75th anniversary, Brock was named one of the 20 All-Time Blue Bomber Greats. He was elected into the Canadian Football Hall of Fame in 1995.

In popular culture

In every episode of the Dave Dameshek Football Program on iTunes Dave and Adam Rank compete in who can make the best organic reference to Dieter Brock. He appeared as a guest on their 100th episode.

References

External links
 Canadian Football Hall of Fame profile
 
 Just Sports Stats

1951 births
Living people
Alabama State Hornets football coaches
American football quarterbacks
Players of Canadian football from Birmingham, Alabama
Auburn Tigers football coaches
Auburn Tigers football players
Canadian Football Hall of Fame inductees
Canadian Football League Most Outstanding Player Award winners
Canadian football quarterbacks
Cumberland Phoenix football coaches
Edmonton Elks coaches
Hamilton Tiger-Cats coaches
Hamilton Tiger-Cats players
High school football coaches in Alabama
Jacksonville State Gamecocks football players
Los Angeles Rams players
Ottawa Rough Riders coaches
Players of American football from Birmingham, Alabama
Sportspeople from Birmingham, Alabama
Tusculum Pioneers football coaches
UAB Blazers football coaches
Winnipeg Blue Bombers players